Andriy Shevchenko is a Ukrainian former professional footballer who represented the Ukraine national football team as a striker for 17 years from 1995 to 2012. He is the Ukraine national team's all-time top goalscorer with 48 goals in 111 appearances, and the third most-capped Ukrainian international. He has represented the nation in two international tournaments, the 2006 FIFA World Cup and the 2012 UEFA European Championship, and participated in each of his country's qualifying campaigns during his international career.

He made his debut for his country in a 4–0 loss to Croatia in a UEFA Euro 1996 qualifying match in March 1995. He did not score his first goal until May 1996, however, when he scored in a friendly against Turkey. On 9 October 1999, during a crucial UEFA Euro 2000 qualifying match against Russia in Moscow, Shevchenko scored his seventh international goal to level the game at 1–1, securing Ukraine a place in the qualifying play-offs. In the first leg of the play-off against Slovenia, Shevchenko scored the first goal of the game in a 2–1 loss. However, in the second leg, the two teams drew 1–1, meaning that Ukraine lost 3–2 on aggregate. During the UEFA section of the 2002 FIFA World Cup qualifiers, Shevchenko scored nine goals in the qualifying group and captained the side to a second-place finish behind Poland, which set them in a play-off tie against Germany where he scored in the second leg of a 5–2 aggregate defeat. During 2006 FIFA World Cup qualification, Ukraine topped their qualifying group, automatically qualifying for the main competition in Germany and their first World Cup in history as an independent nation. In the group stage, he scored one goal against Saudi Arabia in a 4–0 victory and another goal against Tunisia in a 1–0 victory, as Ukraine finished second in the group stage behind Spain. Shevchenko captained the side to a penalty shoot-out victory against Switzerland in the Round of 16, but the team lost to eventual champions Italy in the quarter-finals. He scored his final international goal in the 55th minute of a UEFA Euro 2012 group stage match against Sweden, which ended as a 2–1 victory for Ukraine. He decided to retire from international football after the final match in the group stage against England; it ended with a 1–0 loss for Ukraine.

International goals 
Scores and results list Ukraine's goal tally first, score column indicates score after each Shevchenko goal.

Statistics

See also 
 List of top international men's football goal scorers by country

References 

Association football in Ukraine lists
Shevchenko
Ukraine national football team